Salm-Reifferscheid-Dyck was a small County of the Holy Roman Empire. Its territory was the area around Dyck (south-east of Mönchengladbach) in present North Rhine-Westphalia, Germany. Salm-Reifferscheid-Dyck was a partition of Salm-Reifferscheid, and was annexed by the First French Empire in the French Revolutionary Wars, in 1811.

The county was mediatised to Kingdom of Prussia in 1813, of which Salm-Reifferscheid-Dyck became a princely title three years later. When the committal line died out, in 1888, the style was assumed by the princes of Salm-Reifferscheid-Krautheim.

The full princely style was "Imperial Prince of Salm, Duke of Hoogstraten, Forest Count of Dhaun and Kyrburg, Rhine Count of Stein, Lord of Diemeringen and Anholt".

Counts and Princes of Salm-Reifferscheidt-Dyck (1639–1888)

 Ernest Salentin, Count 1639-1684 (1621–1684), second son of Ernst Friedrich, Count of Salm-Reifferscheidt
  Francis Ernest, Count 1684-1727 (1659-1727)
 Augustus Eugene Bernard, Count 1727-1767 (1706–1767)
  Johann Franz Wilhelm, Count 1767-1775 (1714–1775)
 Joseph Franz, Count 1775–1806, 1st Prince 1816-1861 (1773–1861) (Mediatized from 1806)
  Prince Franz Joseph August of Salm-Reifferscheidt-Dyck (1775-1826)
  Alfred Joseph Klemens, Count and 2nd Prince 1861-1888 (1811-1888)

1639 establishments in the Holy Roman Empire
1811 disestablishments in Europe
States and territories established in 1639
 
Counties of the Holy Roman Empire
States of the Confederation of the Rhine